Marie d'Évreux (1303 – October 31, 1335) was the eldest child of Louis d'Évreux and his wife Margaret of Artois. She was a member of the House of Capet.

She was Duchess of Brabant by her marriage to John III, Duke of Brabant. Her paternal grandmother being Marie of Brabant, she was a great-granddaughter of Henry III, Duke of Brabant and so, her husband's second cousin.

Marie was the eldest of five children born to her parents. Marie's younger siblings included: Charles d'Évreux; Lord of Étampes, Philip III of Navarre; husband of Joan II of Navarre, and Jeanne d'Évreux; Queen of France by her marriage to Charles IV of France.

Marriage 
In 1311, Marie married John III, Duke of Brabant as his father's gesture of rapprochement with France.
They had six children:
 Joanna, Duchess of Brabant (1322–1406)
 Margaret of Brabant (February 9, 1323 – 1368), married at Saint-Quentin on June 6, 1347 Louis II of Flanders
 Marie of Brabant (1325 – March 1, 1399), Lady of Turnhout, married at Tervuren on July 1, 1347 Reginald III of Guelders
 John (1327–1335/36)
 Henri (d. October 29, 1349)
 Godfrey (d. aft. February 3, 1352)

Marie's daughter Joanna was the first woman to be Duchess of Brabant in her own right.

Marie died October 31, 1335, aged thirty-one or thirty-two.

Genealogy

References

Sources

1303 births
1335 deaths
Marie
Duchesses of Brabant
Duchesses of Limburg
14th-century French people
14th-century French women